Epsom Normal Primary School (abbreviated E.N.P.S.) is a co-educational state public primary school located in Epsom, Auckland, New Zealand which educates year 1-6 students.  The school was established in 1886. 

As of the 2013 Education Review Report, average attendance was 666 students, composed of 21% Pakeha, 34% Chinese, 19% Indian, 3% Maori, and 23% "Other".

References

External links
 Epsom Normal Primary School website

Educational institutions established in 1886
Primary schools in Auckland
1886 establishments in New Zealand